The 2016–17 Middle Tennessee Blue Raiders women's basketball team represented Middle Tennessee State University during the 2016–17 NCAA Division I women's basketball season. The Blue Raiders, led by twelfth year head coach Rick Insell, play their home games at the Murphy Center and were third year members of Conference USA. They finished the season 23–11, 15–3 in C-USA play to finish in second place. They advanced to the semifinals of the C-USA women's tournament where they lost to Southern Miss. They received an automatic bid to the Women's National Invitation Tournament where they defeated Morehead State and Wake Forest in the first and second rounds before losing to Georgia Tech in the third round.

Roster

Rankings

Schedule

|-
! colspan="9" style="background:#00407A; color:#FFFFFF;"| Exhibition

|-
! colspan="9" style="background:#00407A; color:#FFFFFF;"| Non-conference regular season

|-
! colspan="9" style="background:#00407A; color:#FFFFFF;"| Conference USA regular season

|-
! colspan="9" style="background:#00407A; color:#FFFFFF;"| Conference USA Women's Tournament

|-
! colspan="9" style="background:#00407A; color:#FFFFFF;"| WNIT

See also
2016–17 Middle Tennessee Blue Raiders men's basketball team

References

Middle Tennessee Blue Raiders women's basketball seasons
Middle Tennessee
2017 Women's National Invitation Tournament participants
Middle Tennessee Blue Raiders
Middle Tennessee Blue Raiders